Takahiko Hara (原 貴彦（ - Hara Takahiko; born November 26, 1963) is a Japanese professional racing driver.

Racing record

Complete Japanese Touring Car Championship (1994-) results

Complete JGTC results 
(key)

References 

1963 births
Japanese racing drivers
Sportspeople from Aichi Prefecture
Japanese Touring Car Championship drivers
Japanese Formula 3 Championship drivers
Living people